Testosterone caproate (TCa), also known as testosterone hexanoate, is an androgen and anabolic steroid and a testosterone ester that is no longer marketed. It was formerly available as a component of Omnadren 250, along with testosterone isocaproate, testosterone phenylpropionate, and testosterone propionate, but this formulation has since been discontinued.

Gallery

See also
 List of androgen esters § Testosterone esters
 Estradiol dibutyrate/hydroxyprogesterone heptanoate/testosterone caproate
 Testosterone propionate/testosterone phenylpropionate/testosterone isocaproate/testosterone caproate

References

Androgens and anabolic steroids
Androstanes
Caproate esters
Testosterone esters